Hebia cinerea is a species of tachinid flies in the genus Hebia of the family Tachinidae.

References

Exoristinae